Lynn F. Hovland (1916 – August 15, 2014) was an American football player and coach. He served as the head football coach at Washington University in St. Louis from 1959 to 1961, compiling a record of 3–23.

Head coaching record

References

1916 births
2014 deaths
American football guards
Washington University Bears football coaches
Wisconsin Badgers football coaches
Wisconsin Badgers football players
People from Bloomer, Wisconsin
Players of American football from Wisconsin